Robin Rowland is the name of:

Robin Rowland (academic), American scholar
Robin Rowland (author), Canadian author
Robin Rowland (judge), British judge